Sodiq Olamilekan Fatai (born 4 June 1996) is a Nigerian professional football player who plays for Portuguese club Sporting da Covilhã.

Club career
He made his professional debut in the Segunda Liga for Gil Vicente on 7 February 2016 in a game against Famalicão.

References

External links
 

1996 births
Sportspeople from Lagos
21st-century Nigerian people
Living people
Nigerian footballers
Association football wingers
G.D. Ribeirão players
AD Oliveirense players
F.C. Paços de Ferreira players
Gil Vicente F.C. players
Leixões S.C. players
S.C. Covilhã players
G.D. Chaves players
Varzim S.C. players
Associação Académica de Coimbra – O.A.F. players
Campeonato de Portugal (league) players
Liga Portugal 2 players
Nigerian expatriate footballers
Nigerian expatriate sportspeople in Portugal
Expatriate footballers in Portugal